Maryina Roshcha is a Moscow Metro station of Lyublinsko-Dmitrovskaya line. It opened on 19 June 2010 and, until 2016, was the northern terminus of the line. The station is in the Maryina Roshcha District of Moscow, north of downtown.

The extension northwest to Petrovsko-Razumovskaya via Butyrskaya and Fonvizinskaya was originally planned to be opened in December 2015. The projected opening date was later shifted to 2016. The extension was finally opened on 16 September 2016.

By 2023, a transfer to the Bolshaya Koltsevaya line is planned to be completed.

References

Moscow Metro stations
Railway stations in Russia opened in 2010
Lyublinsko-Dmitrovskaya Line
Railway stations located underground in Russia